The 1952 Masters Tournament was the 16th Masters Tournament, held April 3–6 at Augusta National Golf Club in Augusta, Georgia.

In strong winds and cool temperatures on the final two days, Sam Snead held on to the lead and won the second of his three Masters titles, four strokes ahead of runner-up Jack Burke Jr. It was the sixth of Snead's seven major titles.

Defending champion Ben Hogan hosted the first Masters Club dinner (popularly known as the Champions dinner). He was the co-leader with Snead after three rounds at 214 (−2), but shot a 79 (+7) on  Sunday and finished seven strokes back.

With a Sunday gallery estimated at 18,000 patrons at five dollars each, the purse was doubled by the tournament committee to $20,000, with a winner's share of $4,000.

Field
1. Masters champions
Jimmy Demaret (7,10), Claude Harmon, Ben Hogan (2,6,7,9,10), Byron Nelson (2,6,9), Henry Picard (6,10), Gene Sarazen (2,4,6,9), Horton Smith, Sam Snead (4,6,7,9,10,12), Craig Wood (2)
Ralph Guldahl (2) and Herman Keiser did not play.

2. U.S. Open champions
Billy Burke, Lawson Little (3,5,9), Lloyd Mangrum (7,9,10), Fred McLeod, Cary Middlecoff (9,10), Lew Worsham (9,10)

3. U.S. Amateur champions
Ted Bishop (a), Dick Chapman (5,8,9,a), Charles Coe (8,9,11,a), Billy Maxwell (11,a), Skee Riegel (9,10), Jess Sweetser (5,a), Sam Urzetta (8,a), Bud Ward

4. British Open champions
Denny Shute (6)

5. British Amateur champions
Frank Stranahan (8,a), Robert Sweeny Jr. (a)

6. PGA champions
Jim Ferrier (9), Vic Ghezzi, Bob Hamilton, Chandler Harper, Johnny Revolta (10)

7. Members of the U.S. 1951 Ryder Cup team
Skip Alexander, Jack Burke Jr. (9,12), Clayton Heafner (9,10), Ed Oliver (10)

Dutch Harrison (9) and Henry Ransom (10) did not play.

8. Members of the U.S. 1951 Walker Cup team
Dow Finsterwald, Bill Goodloe (a), Bobby Knowles (a), Jim McHale Jr. (a), Al Mengert (a), Harvie Ward (a)

William C. Campbell (a), Harold Paddock Jr. (a) and Willie Turnesa (a) did not play. Finsterwald, Goodloe, Mengert and Ward were reserves for the team.

9. Top 24 players and ties from the 1951 Masters Tournament
Al Besselink (10), Julius Boros (10), Johnny Bulla (12), Dave Douglas (10), George Fazio, Ed Furgol, Joe Kirkwood Jr. (10), Bob Toski

10. Top 24 players and ties from the 1951 U.S. Open
Charlie Bassler (12), Al Brosch (12), Marty Furgol, Ray Gafford, Fred Hawkins, Chuck Kocsis (a), Johnny Palmer, Smiley Quick, Earl Stewart, Buck White

Paul Runyan (6) did not play.

11. 1951 U.S. Amateur quarter-finalists
Arnold Blum (a), Jimmy Frisina (a), Tommy Jacobs (a)

Jack Benson (a), Joe Gagliardi (a) and Ed Martin (a) did not play.

12. 1951 PGA Championship quarter-finalists
Walter Burkemo, Reggie Myles

Ellsworth Vines did not play.

13. One amateur, not already qualified, selected by a ballot of ex-U.S. Amateur champions
Johnny Dawson (a)

14. One professional, not already qualified, selected by a ballot of ex-U.S. Open champions
Tommy Bolt

15. Two players, not already qualified, with the best scoring average in the winter part of the 1952 PGA Tour
Doug Ford, Ted Kroll

16. Foreign invitations
Stan Leonard, Bobby Locke (4,10), Albert Pélissier, Norman Von Nida

Numbers in brackets indicate categories that the player would have qualified under had they been American.

Round summaries

First round
Thursday, April 3, 1952

Source:

Second round
Friday, April 4, 1952

Source:

Third round
Saturday, April 5, 1952

Source:

Final round
Sunday, April 6, 1952

Final leaderboard

Sources:

Scorecard 
Final round

Source:

References

External links
Masters.com – past winners and results
Augusta.com – 1952 Masters leaderboard and scorecards

1952
1952 in golf
1952 in American sports
1952 in sports in Georgia (U.S. state)
April 1952 sports events in the United States